The Kuwait national under-16 basketball team is a national basketball team of Kuwait, governed by the Kuwait Basketball Association.
It represents the country in international under-16 (under age 16) basketball competitions.

See also
Kuwait men's national basketball team
Kuwait men's national under-18 basketball team
Kuwait women's national under-18 basketball team

References

External links
 Archived records of Kuwait team participations

Basketball teams in Kuwait
Men's national under-16 basketball teams
Basketball